Kushtia District (pronunciation: kuʃʈia) is a district in the Khulna administrative division of western Bangladesh. Kushtia is the second largest municipality in Bangladesh and the eleventh largest city in the country. Kushtia has existed as a separate district since the partition of India. Prior to that, Kushtia was a part of Nadia district. Kushtia is the birthplace of many historical figures including Mir Mosharraf Hossain (1847–1912), Bagha Jatin (1879–1915) and Lalon (1774–1890). Nobel laureate poet Rabindranath Tagore lived his early life at Shelaidaha.

History
In 1860, the Indigo revolt spread throughout the Bengal province. Shalghar Madhua in Kushtia district was one of the forerunners in this movement. It inspired all indigo farmers in Kushtia to refrain from paying government taxes. Subsequently, with the publication of the Indigo Commission Report, an act was passed prohibiting coercion of cultivators for indigo cultivation and the measure led to the end of the movement.

During the Partition of India in 1947, three sub-divisions of Nadia district i.e. Kushtia, Chuadanga and Meherpur were made into a new district of Kushtia in the then East Pakistan. The town once again became attractive for development in 1954 with the establishment of the Ganges-Kobadak Irrigation Project (also known as G-K Project) headquarters and a number of government offices. The G-K Project is a large surface-irrigation system, with the first crop under this project grown in 1962–63.

The district of Kushtia had significant contribution to the Bangladesh Liberation War. A 147-member company of the 27th Baloch Regiment of the Pakistan Army reached Kushtia on 25 March 1971 from its base at Jessore cantonment. They initially captured the local police station and settled an outpost there, but soon faced considerable resistance from a group of police, ansars, students and local people. By 1 April, the Pakistani army was completely overpowered and the Mukti Bahini took control of Kushtia. Later on 17 April 1971 the Bangladesh Government in-exile formally announced Proclamation of Independence at Baidyanathtala. Subsequently, battles between the Pakistan army and the rebels occurred at many places of the district including Bangshitala of Kumarkhali Upazila, and Daulatpur Upazila.,

After the independence of Bangladesh several different development projects were undertaken in the district of Kushtia. On 22 November 1979 the foundation stone of The Islamic University was laid at Shantidanga – Dulalpur under the districts of Kushtia and Jhenidah. However, In 1982 the university was shifted to Gazipur and admission of students began in the session of 1985–86. Later, on 10 January 1990, the university shifted back to its original site at Shantidanga Dulalpur. In 1984, two subdivisions of Kushtia, Chuadanga and Meherpur, were named separate districts.

Geography

Kushtia District has an area of 1608.80 square kilometres and is bounded by Rajshahi, Natore, Pabna districts to the North, by Chuadanga, Jhenaidah districts to the South, by Rajbari District to the East, and by West Bengal and Meherpur District to the West.

Ganges, Gôŗai-Modhumoti, Mathabhanga, Kaligônga, and Kumar are the main rivers flowing through the district. The average high temperature is 37.8 °C and the average low is 9.2 °C. Annual rainfall averages 1,467 millimetres.

Administrative divisions

Kushtia was created as a district in 1947 with the partitioning of India. Initially, Kushtia consisted of the Kushtia, Chuadanga and Meherpur subdivisions. Each of these subdivisions was later converted to a separate district for ease of management. The Upazilas are:
Bheramara 
Daulatpur
Khoksa 
Kumarkhali 
Kushtia Sadar 
Mirpur
Kushtia district has 5 municipalities (except Daulatpur) which run cities of the same name.

Demographics

According to the 2011 Bangladesh census, Kushtia District had a population of 1,946,868, of which 973,518 were males and 973,320 females. Rural population was 1,711,312 (87.90%) and urban population was 235,526 (12.10%). Kushtia had a literacy rate of 46.33% for the population 7 years and above: 47.88% for males and 44.79% for females.

Muslims formed 97.02% of the population, Hindus 2.92%, and others 0.06%. The absolute number of Hindus has fallen continuously from 1981 to present-day.

In 2001, Kushtia District has a population of 1,740,155, of which 50.86% are male and 49.14% female. In terms of religion, 96.67% dwellers of Kushtia were Muslims, 3.29% follow Hinduism and other religions make up 0.04%. Religious institutions are mosques 3587, temples 300, churches 256.

Tourism 
The Shilaidaha Rabindra Kuthibari is an ancestral mansion of the erstwhile Tagore Zamindari.The Kuthibari, located at Shilaidaha in Kumarkhali Upazila of the Kushtia district, is only 20 km from Kushtia town. Rabindaranath Tagore lived here for part of his life, and wrote many memorable poems there. The Kuthibari is now a museum, and is cared for by the Archaeological Department of Bangladesh.

The shrine of Lalon Fakir, the founder of the Baul order is located at Cheouria, about 2 km from the Kushtia railway station. You will have Famous Tiler Khaja Factory at just beside the Milpara Rail Gate in Kushtia Town.

Media
Numerous Bengali daily and weekly newspapers are published from Kushtia. There is also a Bengali TV channel broadcast in the region.
 KUSHTIATOWN.COM
 DOINIK24
 Amader Zone 24

Notable residents
 Sultana Firdousi, poet, was born in the district in 1974.

See also
Faridpur District
Districts of Bangladesh
Dhaka Division

References

External links

 District Portal

 
Districts of Bangladesh
Districts of Bangladesh established before 1971